Milton Geovanny Palacios Wellington (born April 17, 1988 in Tegucigalpa, Honduras) is a Honduran professional football player.

Club career

Audaz
Palacios signed with Audaz of the Primera División for the Clausura 2018 tournament. With the side San Vicente, Palacios experienced a serious delay in the payment of salaries, he even filed a lawsuit against the club so that he was paid what he was owed. Later, the demand would be resolved with a mutual agreement.

References

External links
 

1988 births
Living people
Honduran footballers
F.C. Motagua players
Liga Nacional de Fútbol Profesional de Honduras players
San Antonio Scorpions players
San Antonio FC players
North American Soccer League players
USL Championship players
Expatriate soccer players in the United States
Sportspeople from Tegucigalpa
Association football defenders
Deportivo Petapa players
Honduras under-20 international footballers
Honduras youth international footballers